Kim Bong-chul (1975 – 23 January 2017) was a male former international table tennis player from South Korea.

He won a bronze medal at the 1995 World Table Tennis Championships in the Swaythling Cup (men's team event) with Chu Kyo-sung, Kim Taek-soo, Lee Chul-seung and Yoo Nam-kyu for South Korea.

See also
 List of table tennis players
 List of World Table Tennis Championships medalists

References

South Korean male table tennis players
2017 deaths
World Table Tennis Championships medalists
1975 births